The All India Sikh Students Federation (AISSF), is a Sikh student organisation and political organisation in India. AISSF was formed in 1943. as the youth wing of the Akali Dal, which is a Sikh political party in the Indian Punjab.

Origin
Before the federation came into being, Sikh youths were organized into local Bhujangi Sabhas in schools and colleges across the Punjab region that promoted Sikh values, heritage and social service. The actual origin of the Sikh Student Federation can be traced back to "Khalsa clubs" established in 1888. The club came to be known as the Sikh Naujawan' Association, whose first president was Harnam Singh. Although small in size and activity, the association published the Khalsa Naujawan' Magazine and sponsored work on religious and social projects. Sikh youths were an integral part of organizations such as the Shiromani Gurudwara Prabandhak Committee, Shiromani Akali Dal and the All India Students Federation.

After partition
On 13 September 2022 All-India Sikh Students’ Federation celebrated its 78th Foundation Day. Abiding by SAD chief Sukhbir Badal's five-member unity committee having Virsa Singh Valtoha, Rajinder Singh Mehta, Karnail Singh Peer Mohammad, Amarjit Singh Chawla and Gurcharan Singh Grewal as their members, the AISSF dissolved its organisational structure. The Akal Takht Jathedar Giani Harpreet Singh had given a call to the splinter factions to join hands for the propagation of Sikhism, both politically and religiously.

Sikh Students Federation factions
The Sikh Students Federation formed in 1944 is now divided into various factions.

Sikh Students Federation led by Parmjeet Singh Gazi. It was reorganized in 2001 and Sewak Singh, a Student from Punjabi University was elected as president. After Sewak Singh, Mandhir Singh headed the organization until 2007 January. Later Parmjeet Singh alias Gazi, a student of higher studies in law at Punjabi University Patiala, became the president of the organization.
All India Sikh Students Federation formerly led by Karnail Singh Peer Muhammad.
United Sikh Students Federation currently led by Jugraj Singh Majhail, formed in 2019 in an effort to unite various student Federations. Uniquely, this faction requires its members to be students, following the original requirements of the Federation.
Sikh Students Federation (Mehta) faction led by Paramjit Singh Khalsa as its president.
Sikh Students Federation (Grewal-Mann) faction led by Samarjeet Singh Mann and Gurcharan Singh Grewal as its president.

See also
 Akhil Bharatiya Vidyarthi Parishad
 National Students' Union of India

References

External links 
Official History
All India Sikh Students Federation

Sikh political parties
Political parties established in 1944
Students' unions in India
Student organizations established in 1944
1944 establishments in India